Jayden Bartels (born November 1, 2004) is an American social media personality, YouTuber, singer and actress. She has over 852,000 subscribers on YouTube and known for her roles on Disney Channel's Coop & Cami Ask the World and Nickelodeon's Side Hustle. She also made an appearance on Dance Moms alongside Maddie and Mackenzie Ziegler. She rose to fame in 2016 on TikTok (originally musical.ly), in which she has 8.3 million followers and over 5,000 videos. Bartels has also released original music, including Alphabet (2020).

Early life
Bartels was born in Los Angeles on November 1, 2004. She has been taking musical theater, ballet, hip hop, jazz, songwriting and acting classes since age eight. Her mother is a yoga instructor and her father is a computer repairman. Her parents were reluctant at first with their daughter getting involved in social media and posting videos. Ultimately, they assisted her in video production regardless once her musical.ly career boosted, with viral videos to follow. She began making 12 videos per day. Bartels is currently home-schooled to keep up with her career.

Selected filmography

References

External links

2004 births
Living people
Actresses from Los Angeles
Social media influencers
American YouTubers
American child actresses
American child singers
American female dancers
American TikTokers